The badminton women's doubles tournament at the 2012 Olympic Games in London took place from 28 July to 4 August at Wembley Arena.

The draw for the tournament was made on 23 July 2012. Thirty-two players from 14 nations competed in the event.

The competition became embroiled in controversy during the group stage when eight players (two pairs from South Korea and one pair each from China and Indonesia) were ejected from the tournament by the Badminton World Federation after being found guilty of "not using best efforts" and "conducting oneself in a manner that is clearly abusive or detrimental to the sport"  by playing to lose matches in order to manipulate the draw for the knockout stage. In one match, both teams made a series of basic errors, and in one match the maximum rally was just four shots.

Competition format
The tournament started with a group phase round-robin followed by a knockout stage.

Seeds

  (group stage, disqualified)
  (gold medalists)
  (group stage, disqualified)
  (silver medalists)

Results

Group stage

Group A

Group B

Group C

Group D

Finals

Group stage disqualifications
A review into two matches in the badminton women's doubles competition played on 31 July was conducted after it appeared that, having already qualified for the knockout stages, players on both sides in each game had been attempting to lose their last group stage matches in order to gain a more favourable draw in the quarter finals.

The matches in question were between China's Wang Xiaoli / Yu Yang and South Korea's Jung Kyung-eun / Kim Ha-na in Group A, and South Korea's Ha Jung-eun / Kim Min-jung versus Indonesia's Meiliana Jauhari / Greysia Polii in Group C. After errors began occurring during routine shots in both matches, including shots going long and serves hitting the net, the crowd reacted angrily, and the first game in the match between Yu Yang and Wang Xiaoli of China and Jung Kyung Eun and Kim Ha Na of South Korea featured no rallies of more than four shots.

A South Korean coach claims to have emulated China so as to avoid playing against another Korean team in the knockout stages before the final, and South Korean head coach Sung Han-kook said "Because they don't want to play the semi-final against each other, so we did the same. We didn't want to play the South Korean team again".

In the second game, the tournament referee initially issued a black card to disqualify the players, but after their team's coaches and officials ran onto the court and remonstrated with him, this was rescinded. Play was allowed to continue while he monitored proceedings, and both the earlier match and this later match were ultimately played to a conclusion, completing the draw for the quarter finals (group B and D having concluded earlier in the day).

Technical delegate Paisan Rangsikitpho said after the Group A match, "If it's true what I hear, this is a shame and I don't like it. And I'm not going to accept anything that I don't like at all. It's not in a good spirit....I apologise to the public, I apologise for everyone and I am not happy."

On 1 August 2012, following a Badminton World Federation review, all eight players were found guilty of "not using best efforts" and "conducting oneself in a manner that is clearly abusive or detrimental to the sport" and were ejected from the tournament. The quarter-finals then continued with the ejected teams being replaced by the other teams from their groups.

The decision was highly debated; some argued that while the teams have not been performing their best effort to win the game at hand, they had been in fact doing their best to win the tournament, and that conserving resources in early matches is a common practice in every competitive sport.

To prevent any repeat of these events, the competition format for the next Olympics was changed: all pairs finishing second in their groups would be placed into another draw to determine who they faced in the quarterfinals, while the top pair in each group would have a fixed position matched to its designated seed in the knockout phase.

References

External links
 Official women's doubles tournament website 
 How Olympic Badminton Made Losing a Winning Strategy (Wired)

Badminton at the 2012 Summer Olympics
Olymp
Women's events at the 2012 Summer Olympics